The Sims-class''' destroyers were built for the United States Navy, and commissioned in 1939 and 1940. These twelve ships were the last United States destroyer class completed prior to the American entry into World War II. All Sims-class ships saw action in World War II, and seven survived the war. No ship of this class saw service after 1946. They were built under the Second London Naval Treaty, in which the limit on destroyer standard displacement was lifted, but an overall limit remained. Thus, to maximize the number of destroyers and avoid developing an all-new design, the Sims class were only 70 tons larger as designed than previous destroyers. They are usually grouped with the 1500-ton classes and were the sixth destroyer class since production resumed with the Farragut class in 1932.

The class served extensively in World War II, and five of the class were lost in the war. Of the five ships lost, four were at the hands of the Japanese and one at the hands of the Germans. The class served on Neutrality Patrols in the Atlantic in 1940-41. Except for Roe, Wainwright, and Buck, the class was transferred to the Pacific shortly after the attack on Pearl Harbor. All of the ships saw extensive combat service. At the war's end in August 1945, three of the seven survivors were undergoing overhauls that were left unfinished, and were ultimately scrapped. The remaining four seaworthy ships were used as targets during the 1946 Operation Crossroads atomic tests at Bikini Atoll. One was sunk by the first blast, while the other three were sunk as targets two years later after serving as experimental platforms.

Design

Compared with the s, the Sims class were increased  in hull length, and started a trend of increased size that led to the numerous larger 2100-ton destroyer classes that marked wartime construction. The class was designed by Gibbs & Cox. They incorporated streamlining of the bridge structure and the forward part of the hull, in an attempt to increase speed and improve fuel economy. They also had an additional 5-inch gun, with the torpedo tubes re-arranged so one less quadruple mount could be used while maintaining an eight-tube broadside.

When , first of the class to be delivered in early 1939, was found to be 150 tons overweight and dangerously top-heavy due to insufficient metacentric height, it touched off a redesign and rebuilding of the class. One  gun (No. 3) and one quad torpedo tube mount were removed, with another torpedo tube mount relocated to the centerline. It was determined that an underestimate by the Bureau of Engineering of the weight of a new machinery design was responsible, and that the Bureau of Construction and Repair did not have sufficient authority to detect or correct the error during the design process. Acting Secretary of the Navy Charles Edison proposed consolidation of the design divisions of the two bureaus. When the bureau chiefs could not agree on how to do this, he replaced both chiefs in September 1939. The consolidation into the new Bureau of Ships was finally effected by a law passed by Congress on 20 June 1940.

Engineering
The Sims class nearly duplicated the advanced machinery of the preceding Benham class, they were the last built with the boiler rooms adjacent forward and the engine rooms adjacent aft and therefore the last one-stack US destroyers. The main turbines developed  on Sims trials and were manufactured by Westinghouse.USS Sims and USS Hughes General Information Book with as-built data at Destroyer History Foundation

Armament

The Sims class introduced the advanced Mark 37 Gun Fire Control System.Friedman, p. 93 With a turret-mounted gun director as in previous systems, the Mark 37 system incorporated the Ford Mark 1 Fire Control Computer mounted in a plotting room deep in the hull, which enabled automatic aiming of guns against surface or air targets with firing solutions in near real-time.Naval Ordnance and Gunnery, Vol. 2, Chapter 25, AA Fire Control Systems The system would evolve and be used extensively to control most 5-inch guns on destroyers and larger ships, and remained in service on US ships until the 1970s.

The class was completed with five 5-inch dual purpose guns (anti-surface and anti-aircraft (AA)); the two forward mounts and the aftermost mount were enclosed. The class proved to be top-heavy, and a quadruple torpedo mount and one 5-inch gun (No. 3) were removed by 1941. Early units were completed with 12 torpedo tubes in three quad mounts, one mounted centerline, the others port and starboard, while later ships were completed (and all eventually modified) with eight in two quad mounts, all on the centerline. The Mark 15 torpedo was equipped. The 5 inch guns were removed some time after the torpedo tubes were removed in most cases.

The as-built light AA armament of four .50 caliber machine guns (12.7 mm), the same as previous 1500-ton classes, was inadequate. This was partially remedied by increasing the number of guns to eight by 1941. As with most US Navy warships, the light AA armament was replaced with 40 mm Bofors and 20 mm Oerlikon guns within 18 months after the attack on Pearl Harbor. Initially, this was four 40 mm in two twin mounts and four single 20 mm guns. In 1945, with the emerging kamikaze threat and the dwindling threat from Japanese surface ships, Mustin, Morris, and Russell had all torpedo tubes removed in favor of four additional 40 mm guns for a total of eight in four twin mounts and were authorized replacement of the 20 mm single mounts by twin mounts; the latter part was not completed.

The as-built anti-submarine armament of two depth charge racks was augmented by up to six K-gun depth charge throwers during the war.

Service
The class served extensively in World War II, and five of the class were lost in the war. Of the five ships lost, four were at the hands of the Japanese and one at the hands of the Germans. The class served on Neutrality Patrols in the North Atlantic, Caribbean, and South Atlantic in 1940–41. Except for Roe, Wainwright, and Buck, the class was transferred to the Pacific shortly after the attack on Pearl Harbor, where they often screened aircraft carriers. Two were sunk as a direct result of this duty by the same torpedo spreads that killed their carriers; Hammann escorting  in the Battle of Midway and O'Brien escorting  on 15 September 1942 (O'Brien did not sink until 19 October). In the Atlantic, Wainwright escorted the ill-fated convoy PQ 17, and with Roe supported Operation Torch, the invasion of North Africa. Buck'', damaged in a collision, missed Torch but was sunk by a U-boat off Salerno, Italy in 1943. The remainder of the class saw hard service in the Pacific. At the war's end in August 1945, three of the seven survivors were undergoing overhauls that were left unfinished, and were ultimately scrapped. The remaining four seaworthy ships were used as targets during the 1946 Operation Crossroads atomic tests at Bikini Atoll. One was sunk by the first blast, while the other three were sunk as targets two years later after serving as experimental platforms.

Ships in class

See also 

 
 
 List of destroyer classes of the United States Navy
 List of United States Navy losses in World War II

References

Citations

Sources

External links
 Sims-class destroyers at Destroyer History Foundation
 Tin Can Sailors @ destroyers.org - Sims class destroyer article 
 Tin Can Sailors @ destroyers.org - Sims class destroyer specs 
 Sims class at DestroyersOnline.com
 "Goldplater" destroyers at Destroyer History Foundation
 Comparison of 1500-ton classes at Destroyer History Foundation
 USS Sims and USS Hughes General Information Book with as-built data at Destroyer History Foundation
 NavSource Destroyer Photo Index Page

 
Destroyer classes